Mahindagamanaya is a 2011 Sri Lankan Sinhala historical film directed by Sanath Abeysekara and produced by Dr. Daminda Upali Fernando. It stars Jeevan Kumaratunga, Dilhani Ekanayake in lead roles along with Roshan Ranawana and Roshan Pilapitiya. Music composed by Rohana Weerasinghe. The film was released on 18 May with the 2600th celebration of Sambuddhathva Jayanthiya. It is the 1165th Sri Lankan film in the Sinhala cinema. The film was produced with a budget of 600 million rupees.

Plot

Cast
 Jeevan Kumaratunga as King Devanampiyatissa
 Dilhani Ekanayake as Queen Ramadatta
 Roshan Pilapitiya as Minister Aritta 
 Roshan Ranawana as Prince Mahanaga
 Oshadi Hewamadduma as Queen Anula
 Uddika Premarathna as Seru
 Rex Kodippili as King Ashoka
 Hemasiri Liyanage as Mantha
 Anula Bulathsinhala as Mantha's wife
 Jayani Senanayake
 Udayanthi Kulatunga as Isikili
 G.R Perera as Chapman of King's House
 Duleeka Marapana as Magani
 Gnananga Gunawardena as Naga Kovil chanter
 Chinthaka Kulatunga as Dikkanda Senevi
 D.B. Gangodathenna as Devil house chanter
 Kumara Thirimadura as Ilanganaga
 Lakshman Mendis as Chief Priest
 Sanet Dikkumbura as Kali Pabbatha
 Hemal Thirimanne as Bhanduka Upasaka

Soundtrack

Awards
 2012 Derana Lux Film Festival Award for the Best Upcoming Actress - Udayanthi Kulatunga 
 2012 Derana Lux Film Festival Award for the Best Lyrics - Rev. Pallegama Hemarathna for song Sansare Barapodi
 Best director for 2600 Sambuddhathwa Jayanthiya by NFC - Sanath Abeysekara

See also
 List of Asian historical drama films

References

External links
 

2011 films
2010s Sinhala-language films
Films set in the Anuradhapura period
Sri Lankan historical films
2010s historical films